The London Concert is a 1978 live album by jazz pianist Oscar Peterson, accompanied by John Heard, and Louie Bellson.

Reception

Writing for Allmusic, music critic Scott Yanow wrote of the album "Whether it be on rapid stomps or sensitive ballads, this trio (which was in reality an all-star pickup group) sounds as if they had worked together regularly for years."

Track listing
 "It's a Wonderful World" (Harold Adamson, Jan Savitt, Johnny Watson) – 5:33
 "People" (Bob Merrill, Jule Styne) – 8:02
 "Ain't Misbehavin'" (Harry Brooks, Andy Razaf, Fats Waller) – 5:07
 "Jitterbug Waltz" (Richard Maltby, Jr., Waller) – 5:40
 "Pennies from Heaven" (Johnny Burke, Arthur Johnston) – 8:58
 "I Get Along Without You Very Well (Except Sometimes)" (Hoagy Carmichael, Jane Brown Thompson) – 7:12
 "Sweet Georgia Brown" (Ben Bernie, Kenneth Casey, Maceo Pinkard) – 7:51
 "Falling in Love With Love" (Lorenz Hart, Richard Rodgers) – 6:51
 "Hogtown Blues" (Oscar Peterson) – 8:03
 "Emily" (Johnny Mandel, Johnny Mercer) – 6:42
 "Satin Doll" (Duke Ellington, Mercer, Billy Strayhorn) – 5:23
 "Duke Ellington Medley: "I Got It Bad (and That Ain't Good)"/"Do Nothing till You Hear from Me"/"C Jam Blues" (Ellington, Paul Francis Webster)/(Ellington, Bob Russell)/(Ellington) – 9:30
 "Cute" (Neal Hefti) – 8:12

Personnel

Performance
 Oscar Peterson – piano
 John Heard – double bass
 Louie Bellson – drum kit

References

Oscar Peterson live albums
Albums produced by Norman Granz
1978 live albums
Pablo Records live albums